Carles is a common Catalan given name of Germanic origin, which also appears as a surname. The English language equivalent is Charles. 

The name Carles can refer to:

People
Carles (name)

Places
Carles, Iloilo, a 2nd class municipality in the province of Iloilo, Philippines, named after the Spanish Governor of Iloilo.

See also

Alfara de Carles
Sant Carles (disambiguation)
Calès (disambiguation)
Cares (disambiguation)
Carle (disambiguation)
Carlee
Carless (disambiguation)
Carley (disambiguation)
Carlos (disambiguation)
Caples (disambiguation)
Cartes (disambiguation)
Charles (disambiguation)

Catalan masculine given names
Catalan-language surnames